Lako Phuti Bhutia (born 20 October 1994 in Sikkim) is an Indian women footballer who currently plays for Shirsh Bihar United and the India women's national football team.

Career
Bhutia who hails from Sribadam, a remote place in West Sikkim is a product of the Mangalbari Women’s Football Academy. The defender horned her skills under coach Palden Bhutia.

She also played for Maldivian club New Radiant S.C. in 2014. Then she joined  Gokulam Kerala FC for 2017–18 Indian Women's League season. 

Bhutia also played for Sunrise WFC in Bhutan Women's National Championship in 2018.

International
In 2012, she was called up to the Under-19 National Team for the 2013 AFC U-19 Women's Championship qualification in Malaysia. She became the 4th Girl from the state to represent the National Team after Pushpa Chetri, Anuradha Chetri and Nima Lhamu Bhutia. She attended a one-month coaching camp at Gandhinagar, Gujarat with the U-19 squad before leaving for Malaysia.

She along with her sister Nima Lhamu Bhutia was selected for the Senior Women's National Football Coaching Camp, which was held from 1 April 2013. This Camp was held for the selection of the Senior National Team for the Asian Cup Qualifying Round. Her sister could not attend the camp due to personal reasons. Lako has represented the National Team 8 times and has 1 goal to her credit.

Honours

India
 SAFF Women's Championship: 2014, 2019

New Radiant WSC
FAM Women's Football Championship: 2014

Sunrise FC
Women's National League runner-up: 2018

See also
List of Indian football players in foreign leagues

References

1994 births
Living people
Indian women's footballers
India women's international footballers
India women's youth international footballers
Sportswomen from Sikkim
Footballers from Sikkim
21st-century Indian women
21st-century Indian people
People from Gyalshing district
Women's association football defenders
Indian expatriate women's footballers
Expatriate women's footballers in the Maldives
Gokulam Kerala FC Women players
Indian Women's League players